= NFL Central Division =

NFL Central Division may refer to:

- AFC North, formerly AFC Central
- NFC North, formerly NFC Central
